Robertas Žulpa (born 20 March 1960, in Vilnius) is a former Lithuanian swimmer who competed for the Soviet Union during his professional career.

Žulpa trained at VSS Žalgiris in Vilnius, becoming the Honoured Master of Sports of the USSR in 1980. He won a gold medal in 200 m breaststroke with a time of 2:15.85 at the 1980 Summer Olympics.

In 1988, Žulpa emigrated to Italy where he started to coach swimming to 11-year-old boys. Later, he became Italian–Russian translator for various companies. Žulpa currently spends much of his time in his native Lithuania working as a Lithuanian–Italian translator.

References

External links
YouTube heat 200 m Breaststroke Olympic Games -80

1960 births
Living people
Lithuanian male breaststroke swimmers
Swimmers at the 1980 Summer Olympics
Olympic swimmers of the Soviet Union
Soviet male breaststroke swimmers
Olympic gold medalists for the Soviet Union
Sportspeople from Vilnius
Lithuanian Sportsperson of the Year winners
World Aquatics Championships medalists in swimming
European Aquatics Championships medalists in swimming
Medalists at the 1980 Summer Olympics
Olympic gold medalists in swimming
Universiade medalists in swimming
Universiade gold medalists for the Soviet Union
Medalists at the 1983 Summer Universiade